Steven Martin (born December 24, 1964) is a former American football defensive end who played in the National Football League (NFL) for the Washington Redskins.  He played college football at Jackson State University. He went to Varnado Highschool and was the first player from Varnado to make it to the NFL. He received a gold football the year of Super Bowl 50 for being on the Washington Redskins when they won the Super Bowl.

References

1964 births
Living people
American football defensive ends
Jackson State Tigers football players
Washington Redskins players
People from Washington Parish, Louisiana
Players of American football from Louisiana